

Low subsonic tunnel
Low-speed wind tunnels are used for operations at very low Mach number, with speeds in the test section up to 480 km/h (~ 134 m/s, M = 0.4). They may be of open-return type (also known as the Eiffel type, see figure), or closed-return flow (also known as the Prandtl type, see figure) with air moved by a propulsion system usually consisting of large axial fans that increase the dynamic pressure to overcome the viscous losses.

Open wind tunnel

The working principle is based on the continuity and Bernoulli's equation:

The continuity equation is given by:

 

The Bernoulli equation states:-

Putting Bernoulli into the continuity equation gives:

The contraction ratio of a windtunnel can now be calculated by:

Closed wind tunnel

In a return-flow wind tunnel the return duct must be properly designed to reduce the pressure losses and to ensure smooth flow in the test section.
The compressible flow regime:
Again with the continuity law, but now for isentropic flow gives:

The 1-D area-velocity is known as:

The minimal area A where M=1, also known as the sonic throat area is than given for a perfect gas:

Transonic tunnel

High subsonic wind tunnels (0.4 < M < 0.75) and transonic wind tunnels (0.75 < M < 1.2) are designed on the same principles as the subsonic wind tunnels. The highest speed is reached in the test section. The Mach number is approximately 1 with combined subsonic and supersonic flow regions. Testing at transonic speeds presents additional problems, mainly due to the reflection of the shock waves from the walls of the test section (see figure below or enlarge the thumb picture at the right). Therefore, perforated or slotted walls are required to reduce shock reflection from the walls. Since important viscous or inviscid interactions occur (such as shock waves or boundary layer interaction) both Mach and Reynolds number are important and must be properly simulated.
Large-scale facilities and/or pressurized or cryogenic wind tunnels are used.

de Laval nozzle 

With a sonic throat, the flow can be accelerated or slowed down. This follows from the 1D area–velocity equation. If an acceleration to supersonic flow is required, a convergent-divergent nozzle is required.
Otherwise:
Subsonic (M < 1) then  converging
Sonic throat (M = 1) where 
Supersonic (M >1 ) then  diverging

Conclusion: The Mach number is controlled by the expansion ratio

References

See also 
 Wind tunnel
 Supersonic wind tunnel
 Hypersonic wind tunnel
 Gustave Eiffel
 National Aerospace Laboratory, Netherlands
 Calspan
Wind tunnels